The 2012 Championship Cup, (known for commercial reasons as the Northern Rail Cup), was the 11th season of the rugby league football competition for clubs in Great Britain's Co-operative Championship and Championship One.

In the final staged at Bloomfield Road in Blackpool, Halifax defeated Featherstone Rovers 21-12 to claim the trophy.

Format 
The twenty teams were split up into two pools. Each team played two home games and two away games against teams in their pool. The top four teams in each pool following the conclusion of the group stage fixtures then progressed into an open draw for the knock-out quarter-final stage. The competition started on February 5.

Toulouse Olympique competed in this competition despite withdrawing from the Co-operative Championship. All the teams from the Championships competed except for the newly reformed North Wales Crusaders.

2012 Competition results

Pool 1

Round 1

Round 2

Round 3

Round 4

Pool 1 Qualification Table 

Source: Northern Rail Cup Table – The RFL 

Classification: 1st on competition points; 2nd on match points difference.
Competition Points: For win = 3; For draw = 2; For loss by 12 points or fewer = 1

Pool 2

Round 1

Round 2

Round 3

Round 4

Pool 2 Qualification Table

Source: Northern Rail Cup Table – The RFL 

Classification: 1st on competition points; 2nd on match points difference.
Competition Points: For win = 3; For draw = 2; For loss by 12 points or fewer = 1

Finals

Finals Tournament bracket

Quarter-finals

Semi-finals

Final

References

External links
 https://web.archive.org/web/20080831022046/http://www.therfl.co.uk/index.php
 http://www.northernrail.org/northernrailcup

National League Cup
Championship Cup
2012 in Welsh rugby league
2012 in French rugby league